Strelka is the name of several inhabited localities in Russia.

Modern localities
Urban localities
Strelka, Lesosibirsk, Krasnoyarsk Krai, a work settlement under the administrative jurisdiction of the krai town of Lesosibirsk in Krasnoyarsk Krai

Rural localities
Strelka, Amur Oblast, a settlement in Solovyevsky Rural Settlement of Tyndinsky District in Amur Oblast
Strelka, Shenkursky District, Arkhangelsk Oblast, a settlement in Shakhanovsky Selsoviet of Shenkursky District in Arkhangelsk Oblast
Strelka, Velsky District, Arkhangelsk Oblast, a village in Puysky Selsoviet of Velsky District in Arkhangelsk Oblast
Strelka, Puchezhsky District, Ivanovo Oblast, a village in Puchezhsky District of Ivanovo Oblast
Strelka, Vichugsky District, Ivanovo Oblast, a village in Vichugsky District of Ivanovo Oblast
Strelka, Krasnodar Krai, a settlement in Krasnostrelsky Rural Okrug of Temryuksky District in Krasnodar Krai; 
Strelka, Irbeysky District, Krasnoyarsk Krai, a village in Blagoveshchensky Selsoviet of Irbeysky District in Krasnoyarsk Krai
Strelka, Semyonov, Nizhny Novgorod Oblast, a village in Belasovsky Selsoviet under the administrative jurisdiction of the town of oblast significance of Semyonov in Nizhny Novgorod Oblast
Strelka, Vyksa, Nizhny Novgorod Oblast, a settlement under the administrative jurisdiction of Shimorskoye Work Settlement under the administrative jurisdiction of the town of oblast significance of Vyksa in Nizhny Novgorod Oblast
Strelka, Chkalovsky District, Nizhny Novgorod Oblast, a village in Kotelnitsky Selsoviet of Chkalovsky District in Nizhny Novgorod Oblast
Strelka, Gaginsky District, Nizhny Novgorod Oblast, a settlement in Vetoshkinsky Selsoviet of Gaginsky District in Nizhny Novgorod Oblast
Strelka, Smolkovsky Selsoviet, Gorodetsky District, Nizhny Novgorod Oblast, a village in Smolkovsky Selsoviet of Gorodetsky District in Nizhny Novgorod Oblast
Strelka, Zinyakovsky Selsoviet, Gorodetsky District, Nizhny Novgorod Oblast, a village in Zinyakovsky Selsoviet of Gorodetsky District in Nizhny Novgorod Oblast
Strelka, Lyskovsky District, Nizhny Novgorod Oblast, a village in Lenkovsky Selsoviet of Lyskovsky District in Nizhny Novgorod Oblast
Strelka, Sechenovsky District, Nizhny Novgorod Oblast, a village in Verkhnetalyzinsky Selsoviet of Sechenovsky District in Nizhny Novgorod Oblast
Strelka (selo), Sokolsky District, Nizhny Novgorod Oblast, a selo in Loyminsky Selsoviet of Sokolsky District in Nizhny Novgorod Oblast
Strelka (village), Sokolsky District, Nizhny Novgorod Oblast, a village in Loyminsky Selsoviet of Sokolsky District in Nizhny Novgorod Oblast
Strelka, Vadsky District, Nizhny Novgorod Oblast, a selo in Strelsky Selsoviet of Vadsky District in Nizhny Novgorod Oblast
Strelka, Borovichsky District, Novgorod Oblast, a village in Opechenskoye Settlement of Borovichsky District in Novgorod Oblast
Strelka, Novgorodsky District, Novgorod Oblast, a village in Trubichinskoye Settlement of Novgorodsky District in Novgorod Oblast
Strelka, Oryol Oblast, a village in Russko-Brodsky Selsoviet of Verkhovsky District in Oryol Oblast
Strelka, Perm Krai, a village in Kishertsky District of Perm Krai
Strelka, Tambov Oblast, a village in Alexandrovsky Selsoviet of Mordovsky District in Tambov Oblast
Strelka, Tver Oblast, a village in Likhachevskoye Rural Settlement of Krasnokholmsky District in Tver Oblast
Strelka, Vologda Oblast, a village in Vostrovsky Selsoviet of Nyuksensky District in Vologda Oblast
Strelka, Voronezh Oblast, a khutor in Nizhneikoretskoye Rural Settlement of Liskinsky District in Voronezh Oblast
Strelka, Yaroslavl Oblast, a village in Voshchazhnikovsky Rural Okrug of Borisoglebsky District in Yaroslavl Oblast

Alternative names
Strelka, alternative name of Bolshaya Strelka, a village in Vlasovskoye Settlement of Oktyabrsky District in Kostroma Oblast;